Austrochaperina aquilonia is a species of frogs in the family Microhylidae. It is endemic to the Sandaun Province, north-western Papua New Guinea. It is only known from two nearby locations in the Torricelli Mountains: Mount Somoro (type locality) and from the village of Wilbeite. The specific name aquilonia is a Latin adjective meaning "northern" and refers to the range of this species in the north coast mountains of New Guinea.

Description
It is a relatively slender-bodied species with a bluntly pointed snout. The hands are relatively small and have small finger discs. The toes are unwebbed. The dorsum is pale graybrown with darker brown irregular spotting and mottling.

Habitat and conservation
Habitat data are missing but Austrochaperina aquilonia is believed to be a forest inhabitant. There are no known threats to this little known species.

References

Aquilonia
Amphibians of New Guinea
Amphibians of Papua New Guinea
Endemic fauna of New Guinea
Endemic fauna of Papua New Guinea
Amphibians described in 2000
Taxa named by Richard G. Zweifel
Taxonomy articles created by Polbot